Personal Velocity: Three Portraits is a 2002 American independent film written and directed by Rebecca Miller.

Plot 
Personal Velocity is a tale of three women who have reached a turning point in their lives. Delia is a spirited, working-class woman from a small town in New York state who leaves her abusive husband and sets out on a journey to reclaim the power she has lost. Greta is a sharp, spunky editor who is rotten with ambition. To spite the hated unfaithful ways of her father, she has settled into a complacent relationship and is struggling (not too hard) with issues of fidelity to her kind but unexciting husband. Finally Paula, who ran away from home and got pregnant, is now in a relationship she doesn't want. She's a troubled young woman who takes off on a journey with a hitchhiker after a strange, fateful encounter on a New York street.

Cast
 Kyra Sedgwick as Delia Shunt
 Parker Posey as Greta Herskowitz
 Fairuza Balk as Paula
 John Ventimiglia as Narrator
 Ron Leibman as Avram Herskovitz
 Wallace Shawn as Mr. Gelb
 David Warshofsky as Kurt Wurtzle
 Leo Fitzpatrick as Mylert
 Tim Guinee as Lee

Reception

Critical reception
On review aggregator website Rotten Tomatoes, the film has an approval rating of 69% based on 103 reviews, and an average rating of 6.5/10. The website's critical consensus states that the film is an "uneven, but a keenly observed and well-acted film about three women's lives." On Metacritic, the film has a weighted average score of 70 out of 100, based on 28 critics, indicating "generally favorable reviews".

Awards
Personal Velocity won the Grand Jury Prize for Dramatic Film and the Cinematography Award at the 2002 Sundance Film Festival.

References

External links
 
 

2002 films
American drama films
2002 drama films
Sundance Film Festival award winners
Films about domestic violence
Films directed by Rebecca Miller
United Artists films
American independent films
2002 independent films
2000s English-language films
2000s American films
John Cassavetes Award winners